Viridivellus is the only genus of moss in the family Viridivelleraceae.

Dicranales
Moss genera